Taras Yurevich Khtey (born 22 May 1982) is a Russian volleyball player, a member of Russia men's national volleyball team.

Biography 
He was born in Lviv Oblast, Ukrainian SSR.

In 2004, he was part of the Russian team which won the bronze medal in the Olympic tournament, and, with the same team, he won the gold medal at the 2012 Summer Olympics in London after initially trailing 0:2 to Brazil in the finals. In 2011, as a part of the national team, Khtey  won the World League and the World Cup.

External links
 Profile

1982 births
Living people
People from Lviv Oblast
Russian men's volleyball players
Olympic volleyball players of Russia
Volleyball players at the 2004 Summer Olympics
Olympic bronze medalists for Russia
Ural Ufa volleyball players
Olympic medalists in volleyball
Volleyball players at the 2012 Summer Olympics
Olympic gold medalists for Russia
Medalists at the 2012 Summer Olympics
Medalists at the 2004 Summer Olympics